Solitude is a football stadium in Belfast, Northern Ireland. It is the oldest football stadium in Ireland, and the home ground of Ireland's oldest football club, Cliftonville. The stadium holds 6,224, but is currently restricted to 2,530 under safety legislation.

The stadium was built in 1890 and has undergone several renovations. In 2002, a new stand was built at one end of the ground to house visiting supporters, and in 2008, a new stand was completed behind the goal at the east end of the ground. A synthetic 3G pitch was installed to replace the previous grass surface in 2010.

History 
Solitude was opened in 1890 after Cliftonville moved across the road from Oldpark Avenue. The ground holds the distinction of having the first ever penalty in International Football taken there. Previously consisting of two pitches (the second of which was sold off and now contains housing), Solitude is the oldest football ground in Ireland.

Solitude has hosted a number of cup finals and international games. During the 1890s and early 1900s Solitude was the home ground of Ireland, replacing the Ulster Cricket Ground at Ballynafeigh. During the 1890s, the ground hosted 11 home internationals. On 3 March 1894, after thirteen attempts Ireland, playing at Solitude, finally avoided defeat to England. Against an England team that included Fred Spiksley and Jack Reynolds, Ireland gained a 2–2 draw. Goals from Olphert Stanfield and W.K. Gibson inspired Ireland to come back from 2–0 down to gain a 2–2 draw. The ground continued to host Ireland internationals into the early 1900s, but was gradually replaced as Ireland's home ground by Windsor Park and Dalymount Park.

Stands

Main stand 

The main stand at Solitude, situated on the western side of the ground, is for Cliftonville supporters only. It is now a very old structure, having been constructed during the 1950s. It has two tiers. The lower tier is terracing and seating, and the upper tier has a mixture of seating and benches. Its capacity is over 2,500 people.

The original stand was destroyed in January 1949 when a fire broke out after a Linfield v Glentoran Irish Cup tie. The match was staged at Solitude as Windsor Park had been closed for a month in the aftermath of the infamous 1948 Linfield v Belfast Celtic Boxing Day tie at which serious crowd trouble erupted.

Also contained within the main stand at Solitude is  Cliftonville Social Club, Cliftonville's licensed premises.
When built, the new main stand will hold an estimated 1,100 supporters and bring Solitude's seated capacity up to around 3,500.

Cage End stand 

The Cage was demolished and a new stand seating 1,600 was opened on 27 October 2008. New facilities under this stand include dressing rooms.

Away End 

Often referred to as "The Bowling Green End" (due to the bowling green behind it), the away end on the north side of the ground underwent a major facelift in 2001, when the covered terracing used to house away fans was replaced by an 880 all-seated stand.

Whitehouse 
The Whitehouse, not unlike "the Cottage" at Fulham's ground Craven Cottage, currently contains the changing facilities and the board room for the club. However the building of the new stand in place of the Cage is expected to relieve the Whitehouse of these duties.  Some have suggested that this historic part of Irish football will be preserved in the form of a museum.
As part of the new main stand the Whitehouse will be demolished to make for a club shop, museum, bar and function room as well as serving as an entrance to new main stand and the underground car park that will ease traffic chaos in the small streets behind the main stand on match day.

Waterworks Stand
The Waterworks Stand was temporarily erected first for a UEFA Champions League game against Scottish Champions Celtic.  Once the Main Stand is rebuilt future plans could see Sport NI, NIFL and IFA give funds to Cliftonville to make a stand on that side that will look a bit like Windsor Park's North Stand to house the Cliftonville and Away fans at big games to help rebrand the Irish League under NIFL. While the Red's attendances have doubled since 2008/09 from 700 to 1400 they would need to further increase considerably for the Waterworks stand to be viable as after the completion of the Main Stand capacity will be 3500.

See also 

 Stadiums of Ireland

References

External links 
 Club home page
 Ground Hopper's tour of Solitude

Association football venues in Northern Ireland
Ireland national football team (1882–1950)
Sports venues in Belfast
Cliftonville F.C.
Sports venues completed in 1890